Kevin Blue Johnson (born September 7, 1979) is an American professional boxer. He has challenged once for the WBC heavyweight title in 2009. He holds notable wins over former world champions Bruce Seldon and Yoan Pablo Hernández.

Amateur career
Johnson started boxing at the age of 18. He was an unheralded amateur with only a 14–2 record but won the New Jersey Golden Gloves.

Professional career
He turned pro in 2002. After only three fights the lanky counterpuncher was thrown in with an undefeated Olympian in Timor Ibragimov, who already had 13 victories. To the great surprise of the audience, Johnson held Ibragimov to a draw. Three fights later in 2004 he handily beat well-known clubfighter Robert Wiggins, who was 19–3–1 at the time. After being somewhat inactive in 2005 he had another good win over a clubfighter in Robert Hawkins 2006 against whom he won a shutout decision. He was regarded by some as America's best heavyweight prospect largely to his dominant jab.

On April 18, 2008, at the Buffalo Run Casino in Miami, Oklahoma, Johnson defeated Terry Smith by unanimous decision. Johnson used his long jab and hand speed to maneuver his way around the aggression of Smith. Johnson scored the biggest win of his career with a TKO victory over a badly faded Bruce Seldon in September 2008 in Atlantic City. Johnson defeated Devin Vargas on May 15, 2009. Johnson was declared winner by technical knockout after Vargas's corner threw in the towel early in the sixth round. With the win, Johnson earned a shot at the world title.

On 12 December 2009 Johnson took on Vitali Klitschko for the WBC Heavyweight title in Bern, Switzerland. Klitschko was never troubled by Johnson in front of an 18,000-strong crowd. The previously unbeaten Johnson was unable to land his trademark jab on the 6 ft 7in Vitali, and went on to lose every round of the contest to the Ukrainian. Johnson injured his shoulder 2 weeks prior to the fight.

After the loss to Klitschko, Johnson racked up victories against Charles Davis and Julius Long before signing up for in Eddie Hearn's Prizefighter tournament in the UK. Johnson would lose in the final against Tor Hamer. Johnson would settle in a gatekeeper role after the tournament, dropping decisions to Tyson Fury, Christian Hammer, Manuel Charr, and Derek Chisora, but beating Solomon Haumono.

On Saturday May 30, 2015, Johnson lost to undefeated Anthony Joshua by second-round knockout, after having been knocked down twice in the first round. This was Johnson's first stoppage loss. Johnson announced his retirement from boxing after the loss to Joshua.

He returned in 2017 with a points win over journeyman Jamal Woods and later challenged Kubrat Pulev for the WBA Inter-Continental title. Despite being outboxed from the start, he managed to take Pulev 12 rounds. Johnson lost a unanimous decision 120–108, 120–108, and 119–109.

On October 14, 2017, Johnson beat Francesco Pianeta via TKO in the seventh round.

After three consecutive losses following his Pianeta victory, Johnson recorded his 33rd and 34th wins against Haris Radmilovic, with a pair of third-round technical knockout victories both coming against Radmilovic in December 2018. 

Five consecutive losses later, Johnson scored a seventh-round knockout victory against former IBF and The Ring cruiserweight champion Yoan Pablo Hernández on August 22, 2020.

The following year, Johnson returned to the ring on June 5, 2021 to face undefeated Agit Kabayel. Johnson suffered the 18th loss of his career, losing a unanimous decision with scores of 118–111, 118–111, and 119–110.

Professional boxing record

Television viewership

Germany

References

External links

1979 births
Living people
Boxers from Georgia (U.S. state)
Heavyweight boxers
People from Asbury Park, New Jersey
American male boxers
Prizefighter contestants